Ritual Tension is an American experimental rock band that formed in 1983 in New York City. They have released three studio albums and an EP. During their first incarnation all records were recorded at Martin Bisi's BC Studio in Brooklyn, and a live album taken from shows at CBGB, before their initial dissolution in 1990. At the same time, various configurations of the band members took part in art performances around Manhattan at venues such as Pyramid Club and PS 122. They re-formed in 2018, began playing shows and released a new album entitled It's Just the Apocalypse, It's Not the End in 2020.

History 
Ritual Tension began with brothers Ivan and Andrew Nahem (sons of baseball player Sam Nahem). They had played together in a band they formed called Crop at San Francisco punk rock clubs in the late 1970s. Ivan had previously played drums in The Situations. Crop's lineup also included former Situations roadies Tom Paine and Mark C. Subsequently Ivan Nahem, Paine and C. moved to New York City in 1980. Displeased with the direction of the band in the new location, Ivan left to form Carnival Crash with longtime friend John Griffin Morrissey and Norman Westberg (the latter had auditioned for Crop at C.'s loft). Carnival Crash split up while recording in the studio and Ivan released a 1983 single, "Edge of Night", under the name Ivan X. Paine and C. subsequently formed Live Skull, while Westberg joined Swans.

Andrew Nahem then moved to New York City and the brothers began rehearsing together in the East Village. The band, as Tension, made their live debut on May 5, 1983 at the Speed Trials music festival at White Columns. Reviews were positive for their 25-minute performance of "All Wound Up", performed with drum machine, guitar, effects and vocals.

Claire Lawrence-Slater was added on bass and eventually Michael Jio on drums. They began playing East Village clubs, rehearsing in the Honeymoon Killers studio. Lawrence-Slater left the band, later playing with Honeymoon Killers and Ultra-Huge. She was replaced by Marc Sloan.

In summer 1985, Ivan Nahem played drums during Swans recording sessions; the resulting tracks were later issued on that band's 1986 albums Greed and Holy Money.

Now known as Ritual Tension, the band recorded their first album, I Live Here, at Martin Bisi's B.C. studio. It was released on their own label, Sacrifice Records, in 1986. After the album's release, Michael Shockley replaced Jio.

The next recording with Bisi was the 1987 EP Hotel California, released by Safe House Records. It featured an eight-minute cover of the title song by the Eagles, a deconstruction and salute to their roots by the Nahem brothers, who grew up in the Bay Area. It also included Ritual Tension's signature song, "The Grind". The EP and the debut were also reissued together by Sacrifice as I Live Here/Hotel California.

As the band gained popularity in the East Village scene, playing clubs like The Ritz, Pyramid Club and The Bottom Line, they came to the attention of CBGB owner Hilly Kristal, leading to headliner slots and a live "Off the Board" album recorded in 1986 at CBGB, titled The Blood of the Kid and released in 1987 by CBGB/Celluloid Records.
 
Expelled was their final studio album, again recorded with Bisi and released in 1989 by Safe House. The group disbanded in 1990, but played a final reunion performance in Hoboken, New Jersey in May 1993.

Past Tense, a 15-track collection of Ritual Tension material, was issued on Sacrifice in 1999.

In 2016, Ivan and Andrew Nahem began working at the studio of Michael Jung's Hizhaus Recording, remixing their early song "All Wound Up" originally recorded at Noise New York with Frank Eaton engineer, as well as rediscovered tapes of recordings by Carnival Crash, which would become the Obelisk Records Carnival Crash release It Is a Happy Man in the fall, 2020.

In 2017, Ivan Nahem began working on a project with Pittsburgh noise artist Gregg Bielski that came to be called ex->tension. Bielski initially asked Nahem to put spoken word vocals atop his soundtracks, and eventually the latter's Ritual Tension bandmates were enlisted for separate collaborations, with Andrew Nahem's guitar on three tracks and Sloan and Shockley contributing to one track each. The resulting album, The Kiss, was released on RORER 714 Records (and subsequently re-issued in Japan by the Meditation label of Ichiro Tsuji of the band Dissecting Table). This was followed by performances by Ivan Nahem and Gregg Bielski with other members of Ritual Tension, which in turn led to a reformation of Ritual Tension in late 2017, without guitarist Andrew Nahem. They played their first reunion date at Century in Philadelphia on February 23, 2018. This was followed by a show at SideWalk Cafe in New York City on March 15, 2018.

The band came together again and played shows in 2018 and 2019, in New York, Philadelphia and Pittsburgh. Andrew did not re-join on guitar, however Marc Sloan expanded his role with an overall more bass heavy approach. They began recording in Rehobeth Beach, DE at Cubano Enfuego Studios, and then moved to Deepsea Studio in Hoboken, to work with friend and engineer Mark C (of Live Skull). Emilio Zef China, who plays with Peter Murphy, played violin and guitar on two tracks.

The album It's Just the Apocalypse, It's Not the End was released on July 28, 2020 on Arguably Records. The album includes seven original songs and two covers: Manic Depression by Jimi Hendrix and Shakin' Street by the MC5. A record release event was scuttled due to Covid, and as of late 2021 the band is in discussions regarding a return to performance.

Reception 
Ritual Tension's releases were critically acclaimed, mostly in fanzines but also in more mainstream press, although critics had a hard time categorizing the band. In Spin, Andrea 'Enthal wrote: "Then there are the bands who aren't part of any movement. They are the leading edge of the underground... Ritual Tension make noncommercial music outside of even punk's accepted norms. It takes some listening to figure out how to hear their sound". Robert Palmer wrote in the New York Times: "The rhythm section is fluid but packs a punch, and Andrew Nahem's guitar work is distinctive and full of energy." Robert Christgau of The Village Voice said: "'Here' is the Lower East Side… Surprisingly, this parochial approach is good for music more intense and universal than, to choose the relevant example, the Bush Tetras' 'Too Many Creeps'". Trouser Press said: "Recorded in 1988, the excellently self-produced Expelled is the finest display yet of the band's offbeat musicianship. The dissonance is so vibrantly arranged and performed that it actually becomes catchy".

It's Just the Apocalypse, It's Not the End also achieved some recognition. Rich Quinlan of Jersey Beat wrote: "Ritual Tension is a band with its roots firmly planted in the punk, no-wave, and noise scenes of the very late 1970s in San Francisco before moving to NYC in the early 1980s… Now, thirty years after their final performance, Ritual Tension has returned, this time sans Andrew, as a trio on the experimental and wonderfully noisy It’s Just the Apocalypse, It’s Not the End. .. Ritual Tension never abandoned their artistic interpretation of what punk rock can be, and It’s Just the Apocalypse, It’s Not the End is a free-flowing and fearless display of confidence from a collection of players who have refused, thankfully, to surrender to any expectations other than their own. The world needs more from acts like Ritual tension right now."

Jack Rabid said this in The Big Takeover Issue #87: “Apocalypse realizes a post-punk continuum from 1986’s I Live Here and 1989’s Expelled. The remembered high-treble bass, big tom drums, and high pitched guitar (see “Tightrope”) return in “Come Back, Come Back” and “Monsters Are Real.” Likewise, Nahem growls, shouts, and spews like Tom Waits and ex-Radio Birdman Deniz Tek, expressing the malicious, McDonalds-slogan mocking “I’m Loving It” and the desperately-seeking-free-alcohol “I Can’t Find the Party”… Wild!” 

The German writer Matze Van Bauseneick wrote in Krautnick Magazine: “Almost out of the blue, the experimental New York no-wave trio Ritual Tension has gotten together again to make a new statement about time and the world: It's Just The Apocalypse, It's Not The End is the title of the first album since the Eighties. And it sounds as if neither time nor the world has passed: dirty fuzz rock… sweeping energy, unique structures with the songs catchy at the same time - so fat!”

Other projects 
Marc Sloan played extensively with many collaborators, including Elliott Sharp's Carbon, Rhys Chatham, False Prophets and Reed Ghazala. He currently works with drummer Simon Fishburn in Forever Moonlight. His compendium album Reel to Real Volume One was released October 1, 2020.

Michael Shockley played in Sweet Lizard Illtet, and currently performs in the Shockley Brothers, Big Hat No Cattle and Hot Sauce Band.

Andrew Nahem has contributed music to various film projects, such as Elevator Moods, Miru Kim and Isidore Roussel's Blind Door, and as the fictional band Infra Dig. He designed the artwork for "It's Just the Apocalypse, It Isn't the End" and the upcoming "Crawling Through Grass," on various tracks of which he also plays guitar.

Ivan Nahem has published stories, essays and poems in various magazines, and was the founder/editor of Yoga Teacher Magazine. Released The Kiss under the band name ex->tension in 2017. His album "Crawling Through Grass" was released May 13, 2022 by Arguably Records. He also created a website for all his projects called onaboutnow.

Discography

Studio albums 
 I Live Here (1986, Sacrifice Records)
 Expelled (1989, Safe House Records)
 It's Just the Apocalypse, It's Not the End (2020, Arguably Records)

EPs 
 Hotel California (1987, Safe House Records)

Live albums 
 The Blood of the Kid (1987, CBGB/Celluloid Records)

Compilation albums 
 I Live Here/Hotel California (1987, Sacrifice Records)
 Past Tense (1999, Sacrifice Records)

Post-Ritual Tension collaborative album 
 The Kiss (2017, RORER 714 Records)

References

External links 
 Facebook page
 Discogs Profile
 Ritual Tension bandcamp page
 Ritual Tension archive work bandcamp page
 Youtube channel
 http://shalom-art.com/artwork/1694837_Rivington_Sculpture_Garden_Ritual.html
https://onaboutnow.com

American post-punk music groups
American post-rock groups
American experimental rock groups
Musical groups from New York City
Musical groups established in 1983
American art rock groups
American noise rock music groups